George F. Dannebrock (March 28, 1906 – July 27, 1989) was an American politician who served in the New York State Assembly from Erie's 6th district from 1945 to 1960.

References

1906 births
1989 deaths
Republican Party members of the New York State Assembly
20th-century American politicians